Lindsay Davenport won in the final 6–4, 6–1 against Sandrine Testud.

Seeds
A champion seed is indicated in bold text while text in italics indicates the round in which that seed was eliminated. The top four seeds received a bye to the second round.

  Jana Novotná (quarterfinals)
  Monica Seles (quarterfinals)
  Iva Majoli (semifinals)
  Lindsay Davenport (champion)
  Amanda Coetzer (semifinals)
  Brenda Schultz-McCarthy (quarterfinals)
  Ruxandra Dragomir (second round)
  Karina Habšudová (first round)

Draw

Final

Section 1

Section 2

External links
 1997 U.S. Women's Hard Court Championships Draw

Women's Singles
Singles
Women's sports in Connecticut